Xiao Zuoxin is a former mayor of Fuyang, Anhui, China. He and his wife were convicted of corruption on November 29, 2000. He is currently serving life imprisonment. His wife, Zhou Jimei, was sentenced to death.

In January 2007, Xiao's property was publicly auctioned.

References

External links
People's Daily, "Bribery Case of Fuyang Ex-Mayor and Wife Tried", September 6, 2000

Political office-holders in Anhui
Living people
Chinese politicians convicted of corruption
Fuyang
Year of birth missing (living people)